In histology, a signet ring cell is a cell with a large vacuole. The malignant type is seen predominantly in carcinomas. 
Signet ring cells are most frequently associated with stomach cancer, but can arise from any number of tissues including the prostate, bladder, gallbladder, breast, colon, ovarian stroma and testis.

Types
The NCI Thesaurus identifies the following types of signet ring cell
 Castration cell, a non-malignant cell arising in the anterior pituitary gland under certain abnormal hormonal conditions.  
 Neoplastic thyroid gland follicular signet ring cell	
 Signet ring adenocarcinoma cell
 Signet ring melanoma cell
 Signet ring stromal cell

Appearance
The name of the cell comes from its appearance; signet ring cells resemble signet rings.  They contain a large amount of mucin, which pushes the nucleus to the cell periphery.  The pool of mucin in a signet ring cell mimics the appearance of a finger hole and the nucleus mimics the appearance of the face of the ring in profile.

Diagnostic significance
A significant number of signet ring cells, generally, are associated with a worse prognosis.

Classification of carcinomas
SRC carcinomas can be classified using immunohistochemistry.

See also
Signet ring cell carcinoma

References

External links
Signet ring cells - med.Utah.edu. 
Signet ring cell definition - cancer.gov.
Signet ring cell cancer information - sites.google.com/site/signetringcancer.

Histopathology